Tim Mastnak  (born 31 January 1991) is a Slovenian snowboarder.

He competed in the 2015 and 2017 FIS Snowboard World Championships, and at the 2018 Winter Olympics, in parallel giant slalom.

World cup results

Wins

Olympic results 
 1 medal – (1 silver)

References

External links

1991 births
Living people
Sportspeople from Celje
Slovenian male snowboarders
Olympic snowboarders of Slovenia
Snowboarders at the 2018 Winter Olympics
Snowboarders at the 2022 Winter Olympics
Medalists at the 2022 Winter Olympics
Olympic silver medalists for Slovenia
Olympic medalists in snowboarding
Universiade bronze medalists for Slovenia
Universiade medalists in snowboarding
Competitors at the 2013 Winter Universiade